Zygaena centaureae is a species of moth in the Zygaenidae family. It is found in Ukraine and Russia.
It is similar to Zygaena cynarae and was once considered to be a form of that species. It has stronger antennae and the 5th spot is prolonged towards the hind angle.

References

Moths described in 1832
Zygaena
Moths of Europe